Asociación Deportiva Ceutí Atlético is a football team based in Ceutí in the autonomous community of Region of Murcia. Founded in 1994, its home stadium is the Estadio Miguel Indurain, which has a capacity of 1,000.

Season to season

3 seasons in Tercera División

External links
Preferente Autonómica 
trecera.com profile

Football clubs in the Region of Murcia
Association football clubs established in 1994
Divisiones Regionales de Fútbol clubs
1994 establishments in Spain